Brazoswood High School is a public high school located in Clute, Texas, United States. It educates grades nine through twelve and is part of the Brazosport Independent School District. Its attendance boundary includes: Clute, Lake Jackson, and Richwood.

The first class graduated 356 students in May 1971. The Alma Mater, written especially for this school, was not completed until just before graduation. When it was played at the ceremonies in May 1971, the graduating seniors were hearing it for the first time and therefore could not sing their alma mater at graduation.

Approximately 2,500 students attend Brazoswood High School. More than eighty percent of the students participate in one or more of the many clubs, organizations, and sports.

In the National Merit Program, Brazoswood had one National Merit Semi-finalist, one Hispanic Scholar, and 9 Commended students in 2012. Brazoswood High School was named as one of the top Texas High Schools by U.S. News & World Report in their article, "Best High Schools 2012." BHS is also ranked nationally in the Top 10%.

In 2015, the school was rated "Met Standard" by the Texas Education Agency.

Demographics

Extracurricular activities
Extracurricular Include:

AFJROTC

Unit TX-20054 is established at Brazoswood High School.
Band
Belles
Choir
Crimestoppers
Debate
FCCLA
Habitat for Humanity
Orchestra
National Honor Society
PALS
Science Olympiad
Spanish National Honor Society
Student Council
Revelers

Athletics

Sports

Brazoswood has produced several championship teams and several individual honors.

State championships
 1974 State Football Champions
 1984 State Baseball Champions
 1992 State Baseball Champions
 2000 National Softball Champions
2007 State Cross Country (Girl) Champions
 2011 State Baseball Champions
2011 State Skeet Shooting Champions
 2012 State Wrestling Champion (Girls' 110lbs)

State qualifiers
 2000 Boys' Swimming
 2000 Girls' Track
 2001 Boys' Golf
 2001 Girls' Track
 2003 Powerlifting
 2004 Boys' Swimming
 2006-11 Wrestling
 2014 Girls' Swimming
 2014 Boys' Water Polo
 2015 Boys' Water Polo
 2017 Boys' Water Polo
2018 Boys' Water Polo
2018 Girls' Water Polo
2017 Robotics
2017 HOSA
2018 HOSA
2021 Boys' Cross Country
2022 Science Olympiad

Feeder patterns 
Ney Pre-Kindergarten feeds into Beutel, Brannen, and Roberts Elementaries. Beutel, Brannen, and Roberts feed into Rasco Middle. Griffith, Ogg, and Polk Elementaries feed into Clute Intermediate. Rasco Middle feeds into Lake Jackson Intermediate. Clute and Lake Jackson Intermediates feed into Brazoswood.

Notable alumni
Robert Ellis - singer-songwriter
A.B. Quintanilla (class of 1983) - musician-songwriter
Rand Paul - United States Senate

Notes

References

Brazosport Independent School District high schools
1969 establishments in Texas
Educational institutions established in 1969